Ray Daniel Williamson Sr. (1895-1973) served in the California State Assembly for the 26th district from 1925 to 1941. During World War I he also served in the United States Army.

References

United States Army personnel of World War I
Republican Party members of the California State Assembly
1895 births
1973 deaths